Total Annihilation is a compilation album by the band Annihilator, it was released in 2010 as a free download.

Track listing 

Tracks 1 and 2 are taken from Annihilator
Tracks 3 and 4 are taken from Carnival Diablos
Tracks 5 and 6 are taken from Criteria for a Black Widow
Tracks 7 and 8 are taken from Waking the Fury
Tracks 9 and 10 are taken from King of the Kill
Tracks 11 and 12 are taken from Refresh the Demon
Tracks 13 and 14 are taken from Remains

Credits 
 Jeff Waters – Guitar, Bass on tracks 1-4, 7-14, Vocals on tracks 9-14, Drum programming on tracks 13-14
 Russell Bergquist  – Bass on tracks 5-6
 Joe Comeau - Vocals on tracks 3-4, 7-8
 Randy Rampage - Vocals on tracks 5-6
 Dave Scott Davis - Guitar on tracks 5-6, 11-12
 Ray Hartmann - Drums on tracks 3-6
 Randy Black - Drums on tracks 7-12
 Ryan Ahoff - Drums on tracks 1-2
 Dave Padden - Vocals on tracks 1-2

References 

Annihilator (band) albums
2010 compilation albums